The Port Jervis Line is a predominantly single-track commuter rail line running between Suffern and Port Jervis, in the U.S. state of New York. At Suffern, the line continues south into New Jersey as NJ Transit's Main Line. The line is operated by NJ Transit Rail Operations under a working agreement with Metro-North Railroad (MNRR).

Norfolk Southern Railway (NS) shares the use of the track for local freight operations between Suffern and Port Jervis. The New York, Susquehanna and Western Railway operates over the line between Hudson Junction (east of Campbell Hall) and Port Jervis, and onward to Binghamton over the former Erie Railroad Delaware Division (now the Central New York Railroad). The tracks have been owned by NS since the 1999 split of Conrail, but were built by the Erie and incorporated into Conrail on its formation on April 1, 1976. Metro-North leased the entire line from NS in 2003, with the possibility of outright purchase after 2006. Since 2003, MNRR immediately began a substantial track and signal improvement program in order to provide a more reliable and comfortable service, for $183 million.

The line runs through some of the most remote and rural country found on the Metro-North system, and includes both its longest bridge, the Moodna Viaduct, and longest tunnel, the Otisville Tunnel.

History

Erie Railroad use

The portions of the line from Suffern to Harriman and from Otisville to Port Jervis were built as the mainline of the New York and Erie Rail Road, opening to Port Jervis in 1848. The route south of Suffern is slightly younger (connected for through service in 1853); the original mainline ran east from Suffern to Piermont. The portion from Harriman to Otisville was built in 1906–1909 as a low-level freight bypass named the Graham Line. This portion of the line bypasses the original Erie mainline through Monroe, Chester, Goshen and Middletown.

The line, along with the Main Line through Paterson, served as a segment of the Erie Railroad's long-distance flagship trains to points west such as Binghamton, New York State's Southern Tier, Buffalo and Chicago, on daily routes such as the day train, the Erie Limited. Additional through trains to Chicago were the Pacific Express, and its east-bound counterpart, the Atlantic Express. The Lake Cities and the Atlantic Express/Pacific Express were night-time departures. The Erie Limited was discontinued in 1963. Other routes west were eliminated throughout the course of the 1960s. The last train west of Port Jervis, #21/#22, a daily train to Binghamton, had its final run on November 27, 1966.

MTA/NJ Transit use
On November 14, 1973, the Metropolitan Transportation Authority agreed to subsidize existing Erie Lackawanna Railway service on the Port Jervis line, which became part of Conrail on April 1, 1976. New Jersey Transit subsidized the service within New Jersey. The MTA was only responsible for paying for Conrail's operation and maintenance of the line and stations. A federal statute, the Northeast Rail Services Act of 1981, was passed, relieving Conrail of its obligation to operate commuter rail service for local and state transportation agencies after December 31, 1982. To ensure that service was not terminated, the MTA created a wholly-owned subsidiary, the Metro-North Commuter Railroad.

On January 1, 1983, Metro-North took over the commuter operations of Conrail in the state of New York, and New Jersey Transit Rail Operations took over the commuter operations of Conrail in New Jersey. This included service west of the Hudson River, where rail lines do not connect directly with New York City. These lines pass through New Jersey, stopping at Secaucus Junction, where New Jersey Transit trains provide service to New York Penn Station multiple times per hour, and terminating at Hoboken Terminal.

The MTA initially equipped the lines with second-hand equipment. In 1984, the Main Line between Harriman and Middletown was abandoned, and service was moved to the longer (by 6 miles) Graham Line, the Erie's freight cutoff. Officially, the first day of regular service on the Graham Line was April 18, 1983. Since this was the first passenger service on the Graham line, new stations were built, but without facilities in order to minimize costs. At the time this was a very unpopular move with commuters, who were used to having their trains stop right in the center of their towns. However, the MTA cited that it was responding to pressure by the towns to have the service moved out of the populated areas due to "traffic concerns" caused by the closures of the grade crossings. The Graham Line passed through no populated areas, and driving to the new stations was an additional time cost for many commuters. However, others wanted trains out of the center of the towns, and so the switch was made. The old mainline was no longer used for freight, so following the move to the Graham line, it was abandoned. The line from Harriman to Middletown is now the Orange County Heritage Trail.

In the mid-1990s, as Orange County started to become a popular place for commuters, political pressure caused the MTA to start improving service, building a new station in Middletown-Town of Wallkill, expanding parking at Harriman, and other improvements. In the 2000s, growth in Orange County accelerated, so the MTA added more service, and started to expand parking lots, which became paid lots in line with the rest of the Metro-North system.

In spring 1997, the Norfolk Southern Corporation (NS) and the CSX Corporation agreed to acquire Conrail, and the acquisition was approved on July 23, 1998, and implemented in 1999. As part of the transaction, the Port Jervis Line went under the control of NS.

Metro-North leased the entire line from Norfolk Southern on April 1, 2003, for 49 years, with the possibility of outright purchase in 2006. Also in 2003, Secaucus Junction station opened, reducing travel time to Midtown.

One oddity that results from the unusual arrangement between the MTA and NJ Transit is that, although the MTA subsidizes the service and maintains all of the facilities (except for the Suffern station), the actual operation of the line is almost totally under the control of NJ Transit–the trains are operated by NJT personnel; the trains are dispatched from Hoboken and the ticket vending machines on station platforms are NJT machines, not Metro-North's. The fare system is a combination of NJT and Metro-North policies.

Hurricane Irene

Service north of Suffern was suspended due to severe damage from Hurricane Irene on August 28, 2011. 14 miles of the line were damaged. The roadbed was washed away, signal cables were exposed or went underwater, bridge structures were exposed, the right of way along the Ramapo River eroded and track was damaged. Shuttle train service between Harriman and Port Jervis started in September, and full train service resumed on November 28, 2011:  one month earlier than anticipated.

Future expansion
In 2008, Metro-North and the Port Authority of New York and New Jersey (PANYNJ) began a joint feasibility study of a possible branch from the line to Stewart International Airport, which the Port Authority had taken over the year before, ending a seven-year privatization experiment. The PANYNJ withdrew from the study after its first phase, having decided that express bus service could meet the same needs much more cheaply. Metro-North is continuing the study on its own. Future improvements for the line include the completion of the cab-signaling system and the construction of a yard near Salisbury Mills to relieve pressure on the Suffern yard.

In a 2013 report, the MTA revealed that planning was underway for installing a second track between Sloatsburg and the Moodna Viaduct, and for the construction of a midway yard on the line.

$83 million has been allocated in the 2015–2019 MTA Capital Program to keep the Port Jervis Branch in a State of Good Repair. This money will be allocated to repairing the Moodna and Woodbury Viaducts, station improvements, replacing or rehabilitating under-grade bridges, track improvements and capacity improvements. The MTA's 20 Year Needs Report includes the installation of Positive Train Control; the continued rehabilitation and replacement of under-grade bridges and culverts; the replacement of the diesel fleet; and the replacement of the Woodbury and Moodna Viaducts.

In 2017, Metro-North started its West of Hudson Regional Transit Access Study to evaluate possible improvements in the Port Jervis Line service. An open-house presentation took place on February 15, 2017. $150 million in improvements will be made from 2017 to 2023. As part of the study, three possible sites for a midpoint yard were evaluated: Harriman, Salisbury Mills, Campbell Hall. The Campbell Hall site was chosen as it has the least potential to block the line if a train breaks down; because of its lower cost;  and because it advances an operating plan to have inner service on the line run from Middletown. In addition, three passing sidings would be added near the Tuxedo, Salisbury Mills and Middletown stations. The sidings and the yard would allow for increased service on the line, from the current 27 trains a day to as many as 44. Trains between Port Jervis and Middletown would be increased by one to 26; trains between Middletown and Campbell Hall would be increased from 27 to 37, and trains between Campbell Hall to Hoboken would be increased to 44. The midpoint yard and passing sidings would be open in 2023.

The passing sidings would all be at least two miles (3.2 km) long, bringing the line closer to the railroad's eventual goal of double-tracking all of it. While they can be built within the railroad's existing right-of-way, the midpoint yard—estimated to be —would require the purchase of additional land. When complete it could hold as many as nine additional trains.

Description

Port Jervis Line trains start at Hoboken and then stop at Secaucus Junction to take passengers connecting from New York Penn Station. Most of the Port Jervis Line trains then travel to New York State at Suffern, running non-stop or making one stop at Ramsey Route 17 station. Those can be routed via either the Main Line or Bergen County Line between Secaucus and Ridgewood. On weekends, most Port Jervis trains run local, making all stops on either line.

From Suffern, the line follows the same narrow valley as the New York State Thruway and NY 17. The stations at Sloatsburg and Tuxedo are very close to 17 and, while Harriman also has its entrance on 17, its actual platform is farther back, adjacent to the Thruway. Harriman is the busiest station on the line. One peak hour train in each direction runs nonstop between Secaucus and Harriman. The Tuxedo station is the only stop on the line with the original (1883) passenger station building.

After crossing under the on-ramp from 17 to the Thruway and passing Woodbury Commons, the line gradually moves away from the Thruway, crossing NY 32 and running along the shoulder of Schunemunk Mountain, where it twice is crossed by hiking trails. At Schunemunk's north end, it curves along to the Moodna Viaduct: the highest and longest railroad trestle east of the Mississippi River. Immediately afterward, it crosses NY 94 and arrives at Salisbury Mills-Cornwall in the Town of Cornwall.

The westward curve accelerates afterward and the line begins to run almost east–west across central Orange County. Campbell Hall station services the towns of Goshen, Montgomery and Walden.

The track crosses the Wallkill River, then Interstate 84, to run parallel to NY 211 near Highland Lakes State Park for a while. Shortly after leaving the highway's side, trains arrive at Middletown near the popular Galleria at Crystal Run shopping mall.

Almost unnoticed from the highway, the line crosses under the Route 17 expressway (the future Interstate 86) after leaving Middletown. A second track begins at Howells, to accommodate trains waiting for others to clear the Otisville Tunnel. The siding rejoins the mainline just after the Otisville station, as trains enter a mile-long (1.6 km) tunnel under the Shawangunk Ridge: the longest on Metro-North.

Once on the western end, in some of the most undeveloped countryside Metro-North passes through, trains make a long descent of the west side of Shawangunk Ridge, parallel to the Neversink River valley southwards, reaching valley level just before the terminal station Port Jervis and the yard beyond.

Stations

Rolling stock
All trains on the Port Jervis Line are push-pulled by diesel locomotives, with locomotives normally facing west. Most of the equipment used on the line is owned by NJ Transit, while some coaches and locomotives are owned by Metro-North. The locomotives used on the line range from GP40PH-2Bs, F40PH-3Cs, PL42ACs and GP40FH-2Ms, with the occasional ALP-45DP. A total of fifteen locomotives are in Metro-North colors. Coach cars on the line are all Comet V's both owned by Metro-North and NJ Transit. In July 2018, Metro-North Rail Commuter Council Vice-chairman Orrin Getz announced the agency's intention to purchase 15 new Siemens Charger SC-44 locomotives to replace the current locomotive fleet for the Port Jervis Line.

Bibliography

References

External links

The Port Jervis Line at piercehaviland.org
Port Jervis Line Capacity Improvements Study at mta.info

Metro-North Railroad
NJ Transit Rail Operations
Erie Railroad
Transportation in Orange County, New York
Rail infrastructure in New Jersey
Erie Railroad lines